Stephen Gilbert Richard Davey (born 5 September 1948 in Plymouth) is an English former footballer who played in the Football League for Plymouth Argyle, Hereford United, Portsmouth and Exeter City. For Plymouth he played either as a striker or at full back. He played a key role in Portsmouth's promotion from the Fourth Division in 1979–80, playing mainly at centre-back.

He played twice for England Youth in the summer of 1967, and later played for several non-league clubs in the south-west of England including Bideford, Liskeard Athletic, Saltash United and St Blazey.

He is now a commentator for BBC Radio Devon, co-commentating on Plymouth Argyle matches alongside Gordon Sparks.

References

External links
 

1948 births
Living people
Footballers from Plymouth, Devon
English footballers
Plymouth Argyle F.C. players
Hereford United F.C. players
Portsmouth F.C. players
Exeter City F.C. players
English Football League players
Bideford A.F.C. players
Liskeard Athletic F.C. players
Saltash United F.C. players
St Blazey A.F.C. players
Association football defenders